is a Japanese politician of the Liberal Democratic Party, a member of the House of Representatives in the Diet (national legislature) and the former Minister of Education, Science and Technology. He is currently serving as the chairperson of the LDP Election Strategy Committee, as well as the chairperson of Artificial Intelligence and Future Socioeconomic Strategy Headquarters  and the president of the Japan-Mekong Parliamentary Friendship Association.

A native of Hamamatsu in Shizuoka Prefecture and graduate of Ambassador College and Keio University, he was elected to the House of Representatives for the first time in 1990. After losing the seat in 1996, he was re-elected in 1999 but lost the seat again in 2000. He was once again re-elected in 2003.

In the Cabinet of Prime Minister Tarō Asō, Shionoya was appointed on 24 September 2008 as Minister of Education, Science and Technology. This was Shionoya's first Cabinet post.

He serves as Secretary General of the Japan Scout Parliamentary Association and Honorary President of the World Scout Parliamentary Union.

References

External links 
 Official website in Japanese

Education ministers of Japan
Living people
1950 births
Scouting in Japan
People from Hamamatsu
Liberal Democratic Party (Japan) politicians
Members of the House of Representatives (Japan)
Keio University alumni
21st-century Japanese politicians
Science ministers of Japan
Technology ministers of Japan